Artur Vader (16 February 1920 – 25 May 1978) was the Chairman of the Presidium of the Supreme Soviet of the Estonian Soviet Socialist Republic from 1970 – 1978. He was born in Gorbovo, Liozna District, Vitebsk Region, Byelorussian SSR.

He was the First Secretary of the Tallinn City Committee of the Communist Party of Estonia from 1952 to 1959. Between 1963 and 1964 he served as chairman of the Committee of Party and State Control, and the Chairman of the Council of Ministers of the Estonian SSR, and the second secretary of the Central Committee of the Communist Party of Estonia. Vader was appointed the chairman of the Presidium of the Supreme Soviet of the Estonian SSR in 1970. He gained the status of a candidate member of the Central Committee of the CPSU in 1966 and would keep that position until 1971.

Awards 
 Order of Lenin (1965) 
Two Orders of the Red Banner of Labour (1970) 
 Order of the October Revolution (1973)
Order of Glory, 3rd class

References 

1920 births
1978 deaths
People from Liozna District
Members of the Central Committee of the Communist Party of Estonia
Central Committee of the Communist Party of the Soviet Union candidate members
Heads of state of the Estonian Soviet Socialist Republic
Members of the Supreme Soviet of the Estonian Soviet Socialist Republic, 1963–1967
Members of the Supreme Soviet of the Estonian Soviet Socialist Republic, 1967–1971
Members of the Supreme Soviet of the Estonian Soviet Socialist Republic, 1971–1975
Members of the Supreme Soviet of the Estonian Soviet Socialist Republic, 1975–1980
Seventh convocation members of the Supreme Soviet of the Soviet Union
Eighth convocation members of the Supreme Soviet of the Soviet Union
Ninth convocation members of the Supreme Soviet of the Soviet Union
Soviet military personnel of World War II
Recipients of the Order of Lenin
Recipients of the Order of the Red Banner of Labour
Burials at Metsakalmistu